Royal war and popular (or people's) war (Guerra regia e guerra di popolo) is a recurring concept in the historiography of the Italian Risorgimento, referring to the two possible forms in which the whole of Italy could be conquered and formed into a single independent state.

First Italian Independence War
In the First Independence War for Italy, which ended unfavourably for the Risorgimento cause, there was a balance between two initiatives: people's war and royal war. The notable moments in the people's war were:
the Five Days of Milan, chronologically the first notable action that led to the Austrians' exit from Milan, which was thus brought about solely by a spontaneous revolt by the city's inhabitants.
the Repubblica di San Marco, which governed Venice from 17 March 1848 to 22 August 1849 and only fell after a hard-fought siege.
the Ten Days of Brescia, in which Brescia's inhabitants responded to Austrian repression by resisting their troops from 23 March (the day of Piedmont's defeat at Novara) to 1 April 1849.
the Roman Republic from 24 November 1848 (the flight of pope Pius IX) to 3 July 1849.

The royal war was the campaign by the Kingdom of Piedmont, including the battles of Goito, Peschiera del Garda, Custoza and Novara.

Second Italian Independence War
The Second Independence War was a typical example of royal war led by Victor Emmanuel II, allied to Napoleon III in conducting a war against Austria. The people's war was only a minor support Hunters of the Alps, a corps of volunteers commanded by Giuseppe Garibaldi and considered as a special unit within the royal army.

Expedition of the Thousand
The Expedition of the Thousand was entirely a people's war, with Garibaldi being its central figure.

Third Italian Independence War
In the Third Independence War, with the Italian defeats at Custoza and Lissa, was essentially a royal war, though the corps of volunteers under Garibaldi did win a victory at Bezzecca.

Analogy with the Resistance
The same contrast between royal war and people's war can be applied to the history of the Second World War, when a disastrous war under the royal and fascist régime was followed by the people's war of the Italian Resistance.

Notes

Bibliography
A. Monti, Guerra regia e guerra di popolo nel Risorgimento. in Questioni di Storia a cura di Rota. (1951)

Italian unification